Thiruvetriyur is a Village in Tiruvadanai taluk, Ramanathapuram district, Tamil Nadu in southern India.

The place is famous for ancient Bagampriyal Kovil.
Manirethinam R

References

External links 
 Dinamalar
 Wikimapia
 
http://bhagampriyalamman.co.nf/

Cities and towns in Ramanathapuram district